Bathydoxa euxesta is a moth in the family Xyloryctidae, and the only species in the genus Bathydoxa. It was described by Turner in 1935 and is found in Australia, where it has been recorded from Queensland, New South Wales and Victoria.

The wingspan is 24–30 mm. The forewings are grey with the costal edge grey-whitish and with a blackish subcostal streak from the base of the costa to one-fourth. There is a broader subdorsal streak from the base to three-fourths and the discal stigmata are represented by a fine longitudinal streak, sometimes interrupted, edged beneath with whitish. The hindwings are grey, paler towards the base.

References

Xyloryctidae
Monotypic moth genera
Moths of Australia
Xyloryctidae genera